The mayor of Quezon City is the head of the executive branch of Quezon City's government. The mayor holds office at the Quezon City Hall.

Like all local government heads in the Philippines, the mayor is elected via popular vote, and may not be elected for a fourth consecutive term (although the former mayor may return to office after an interval of one term). In case of death, resignation or incapacity, the vice mayor becomes the mayor.

Until 1951, the Mayor of Quezon City was appointed by the President of the Philippines. Through Republic Act No. 537 signed by President Elpidio Quirino on June 16, 1950, Quezon City had its first mayoralty election on November 13, 1951.

List

 Appointed ad interim mayor of by President Manuel L. Quezon effective October 23, 1939, but his appointment paper as signed by Quezon on November 10, 1939 showed the effective date from October 12, 1939. 
 Arrested by the Japanese forces during their occupation. 
 Died in office. 
 Served in an acting capacity. 
 Resigned. 
 Dismissed by the Department of the Interior and Local Government. 
 Mayor of the City of Greater Manila which included Quezon City.

Elections
1951 Quezon City mayoral election
1955 Quezon City mayoral election
1959 Quezon City mayoral election
1963 Quezon City mayoral election
1967 Quezon City mayoral election
1971 Quezon City mayoral election
1980 Quezon City mayoral election
1988 Quezon City local elections
1992 Quezon City local elections
1995 Quezon City local elections
1998 Quezon City local elections
2001 Quezon City local elections
2004 Quezon City local elections
2007 Quezon City local elections
2010 Quezon City local elections
2013 Quezon City local elections
2016 Quezon City local elections
2019 Quezon City local elections
2022 Quezon City local elections
2025 Quezon City local elections

Vice Mayor of Quezon City
The Vice Mayor is the second-highest official in the city. The vice mayor is elected via popular vote; although most mayoral candidates have running mates, the vice mayor is elected separately from the mayor. This can result in the mayor and the vice mayor coming from different political parties.

The Vice Mayor is the presiding officer of the Quezon City Council, although he/she can only vote as the tiebreaker. When a mayor is removed from office, the vice mayor becomes the mayor until the scheduled next election.

List of Vice Mayors of Quezon City

References

Sources
 Sangguniang Panlungsod of Quezon City

Quezon City
Local government in Quezon City
Quezon City
Mayors of Quezon City
Politics of Quezon City